Kunlong is the capital town of Kunlong Township in Shan State. its coordination is 23 25' 00" N and 98 39' 00" E.

The Wa people inhabit the hills immediately overlooking the Nam Ting valley.

History
It is the home of Kunlong Bridge over the Salween River. There was a 42 days-long battle between Burma Communist Party (BCP) and Myanmar Army from November 1971 to January 1972 to control that strategic bridge.

Further reading
 Myanmar States/Divisions & Townships Overview Map

References

Township capitals of Myanmar